Domingo DeGrazia is an American politician. He is also a guitarist and music composer that practices appellate law. DeGrazia is a former member of the Arizona House of Representatives representing District 10 from 2019 to 2023. DeGrazia was elected in 2018, defeating incumbent Republican State Representative Todd Clodfelter. DeGrazia is a member of the Eastern Band of Cherokee Indians through his mother. DeGrazia's father is Southwestern artist Ettore DeGrazia.

DeGrazia graduated from Embry–Riddle Aeronautical University, and received his Juris Doctor degree from Oklahoma City University law school, before practicing law as a trial attorney in the juvenile court system.

References

Year of birth missing (living people)
Living people
American people of Italian descent
Democratic Party members of the Arizona House of Representatives
Eastern Band Cherokee people
Native American state legislators in Arizona
21st-century American politicians